Macroperipatus guianensis is a species of velvet worm in the Peripatidae family. The male of this species has 24 pairs of legs; females have 27 or 28 leg pairs, usually 28. This species ranges from 30 mm to 80 mm in length. The type locality is in Guyana.

References

Onychophorans of tropical America
Onychophoran species
Animals described in 1903